FET is a free and open-source time tabling app for automatically scheduling the timetable of a school, high-school or university. FET is written in C++ using the Qt cross-platform application framework. Initially, FET stood for "Free Evolutionary Timetabling"; as it is no longer evolutionary, the E in the middle can stand for anything the user prefers.

FET can operate in different modes appropriate to a variety of special circumstances. In addition to the standard "Official" timetabling mode, there is a "Mornings-Afternoons" mode suitable for use with Moroccan or Algerian school systems, a "Block planning" mode that supports planning for block timetables (commonly used in North American and International Baccalaureate schools), and a "Terms" mode suitable for use with the Finnish school system.

FET Features

 Localized to many languages;
 Fully automatic generation algorithm, allowing also semi-automatic or manual allocation;
 Platform independent implementation;
 Flexible modular XML format for the input file;
 Import/export from CSV format;
 The resulted timetables are exported into HTML, XML and CSV formats;

See also

 Data management
 SchoolTool

References

External links
 Website

Educational software
Cross-platform free software
Free educational software
Data management software
School-administration software
Software using the GNU AGPL license